The 2018–19 season was Al-Hilal's 43rd consecutive season in the top flight of Saudi football and 61st year in existence as a football club. Along with the Pro League, the club competed in the Saudi Super Cup, the King Cup, Arab Club Champions Cup, the Saudi-Egyptian Super Cup and the Champions League. The season covers the period from 1 July 2018 to 30 June 2019.

Squad information
Players and squad numbers last updated on 23 August 2018.Note: Flags indicate national team as has been defined under FIFA eligibility rules. Players may hold more than one non-FIFA nationality.

Transfers

In

Loans in

Out

Loans out

Pre-season and friendlies

Competitions

Saudi Super Cup

As champions of the 2017–18 Pro League, Al-Hilal took on the 2018 King Cup winners, Al-Ittihad, for the season-opening Saudi Super Cup.

Pro League

Al-Hilal entered the competition as the defending champions.

League table

Results summary

Results by round

Matches
All times are local, AST (UTC+3).

King Cup

All times are local, AST (UTC+3).

AFC Champions League

Group stage 

The group stage draw was made on 22 November 2018 in Kuala Lumpur. Al-Hilal were drawn with Al-Duhail, Al-Ain, and Esteghlal.

Arab Club Champions Cup

Round of 32

Round of 16

Quarter-finals

Semi-finals

Final

Saudi-Egyptian Super Cup

As champions of the 2017–18 Pro League, Al-Hilal took on the 2017–18 Egypt Cup winners, Zamalek, for the Saudi-Egyptian Super Cup.

Statistics

Appearances
Last updated on 20 May 2019.

|-
! colspan=18 style=background:#dcdcdc; text-align:center|Goalkeepers

|-
! colspan=18 style=background:#dcdcdc; text-align:center|Defenders

|-
! colspan=18 style=background:#dcdcdc; text-align:center|Midfielders

|-
! colspan=18 style=background:#dcdcdc; text-align:center|Forwards

|-
! colspan=18 style=background:#dcdcdc; text-align:center| Players sent out on loan this season

|-
! colspan=18 style=background:#dcdcdc; text-align:center| Player who made an appearance this season but have left the club

|-
|}

Goalscorers

Last Updated: 20 May 2019

Assists

Last Updated: 20 May 2019

Clean sheets

Last Updated: 11 May 2019

References

Al Hilal SFC seasons
Hilal